Créchy is a commune in the Allier department in central France.

Between this village and nearby Billy, lagerstätten have yielded a rich assemblage of fossils from the Oligocene-Miocene boundary (c. 24-23 million years ago).

Population

See also
Communes of the Allier department

References

  (2003): La limite Oligocène-Miocène en Limagne: changements fauniques chez les mammifères, oiseaux et ostracodes des différents niveaux de Billy-Créchy (Allier, France) [The Oligocene-Miocene boundary in Limagne: faunal changes in the mammals, birds and ostracods from the different levels of Billy-Créchy (Allier, France)] [French with English abstract]. Geobios 36(6): 719–731.  (HTML abstract)

Communes of Allier
Allier communes articles needing translation from French Wikipedia